The Quiet Woman is a 1951 British crime film directed by John Gilling and based on a story by Ruth Adam, about a criminal's wife who attempts to build a new life after her husband goes to prison, only to be menaced by him when he escapes. It starred Derek Bond, Jane Hylton and Dora Bryan.

Plot
Duncan McLeod (Derek Bond), a gentleman artist and former Naval officer, assisted by his crewman Lefty Brown (Michael Balfour), engages in smuggling contraband liquor between France and Britain across the English Channel. Duncan and Lefty store the liquor at "The Quiet Woman", a local pub in a coastal town on the edge of Romney Marsh in Kent, only to find one day that its complicit owner has moved away without telling them, and the pub is now being run by Jane Foster (Jane Hylton) and her maid Elsie (Dora Bryan). Jane makes clear that she does not approve of activities that break the law, and demands that Duncan and Lefty remove their cache of contraband liquor from her property immediately or she will contact customs officials. Duncan and Lefty are attracted to Jane and Elsie respectively, and try to court them. The women are initially cold, but over time become more receptive to them. Unbeknownst to Duncan, Jane was unhappily married to criminal Jim Cranshaw, who is now serving a prison term. Jane is keeping her past a secret while trying to build a new, law-abiding life.

Two new arrivals in town take rooms at the pub: Bromley (John Horsley), an artist and a former Navy colleague of Duncan, and Helen (Dianne Foster), an artist's model and former girlfriend of Duncan who has come in response to his request for a model to pose for his latest painting. Helen unsuccessfully attempts to rekindle the romance between herself and Duncan, who is not interested in her and is pursuing Jane. Bromley is supposedly on holiday, but in reality is a customs inspector tasked with secretly investigating Duncan's smuggling activities.

Jane's former husband, Jim Cranshaw (Harry Towb), suddenly appears at the pub, having escaped from prison several days earlier, and demands that Jane hide him and arrange with Duncan to transport him across the Channel to France. He threatens Jane that unless she helps him, he will tell authorities that she has been hiding him ever since he escaped, making her look complicit. Under pressure, Jane agrees to hide Jim, but refuses to tell Duncan or involve him in the matter. Meanwhile, a newspaper runs a story on the escape revealing Jane's past involvement with Jim. Helen jealously reveals the story to Duncan and Jane in an attempt to break up their relationship, and makes clear that she suspects Jane of being involved in Jim's most recent escape. Fed up with Helen's interference, Duncan fires her from the model job and tells her to leave town. Duncan then learns via Lefty and Elsie that Jane is hiding Jim in the pub's attic. In order to protect Jane, Duncan and Lefty secretly move Jim from the attic without Jane's knowledge, and spirit him away aboard Duncan's boat for transport to France. As a result, when the local police come to the pub searching for Jim, he is gone, but Helen, who has not left town as directed, hints that he went to Duncan's house. Bromley chases after Duncan's boat and sees that Duncan and Jim are on board, but Jim then draws a gun on Duncan, causing the two men to fight and fall overboard. Bromley and Lefty rescue Duncan, but Jim is struck by Duncan's boat and killed. Bromley, who has become aware of Duncan's love for Jane, says he will tell police that Jim stowed away aboard Duncan's boat and that Duncan should go along with the story as it would be best for Jane. Duncan returns to a waiting Jane, who is now free to love him.

Cast
Duncan McLeod - Derek Bond
Jane Foster -	Jane Hylton
Elsie Tripp - Dora Bryan
Lefty Brown - Michael Balfour
Helen - Dianne Foster
Jim Cranshaw - Harry Towb (film debut)
Bromley - John Horsley

Critical reception
The film historians Steve Chibnall and Brian McFarlane say Jane Hylton "made something very interesting of the pub-keeper with an escaped-convict husband and a dashing smuggler boyfriend (Derek Bond). She suggests, often with evocative stillness, a woman whose past is unravelling and whose future she is tentatively trying to make something of." They also praise Dora Bryan's strong performance in support.

References

External links 
 

1951 films
1951 crime films
1950s English-language films
Films directed by John Gilling
British crime films
British black-and-white films
1950s British films